Dactyloceras catenigera is a moth in the family Brahmaeidae. It was described by Ferdinand Karsch in 1895. It is found in Tanzania.

References

Endemic fauna of Tanzania
Brahmaeidae
Moths described in 1895